The 2016 Commonwealth Weightlifting Championships were held at the SPICE Arena in Bayan Baru, Penang, Malaysia from 25 to 29 October 2016.

The event was limited to seniors and juniors. At the same venue, youth weightlifters instead contested the preceding World Youth Weightlifting Championships, where they were awarded Commonwealth medals (if desired, their results also featured in the subsequent junior/senior standings).

Results shown below are for the senior competition only. Junior and youth results are cited here and here respectively.

Medal table

Medal summary

Men

Women

References

External links
Senior results book
Junior results book
Youth results book

Weightlifting competitions
Weightlifting
Commonwealth Weightlifting Championships
Commonwealth Weightlifting Championships
Commonwealth Weightlifting Championships
International sports competitions hosted by Malaysia
Weightlifting in Malaysia
Commonwealth Weightlifting Championships